Carl Roark Holladay (born 1943) is an American scholar of New Testament, Christian origins, and Hellenistic Judaism. He is the Charles Howard Candler Professor Emeritus of New Testament at Emory University's Candler School of Theology and an Elected Fellow of the American Academy of Arts and Sciences.

Biography 
Born October 18, 1943, Holladay was born and raised in Huntingdon, Tennessee. He started his undergraduate education at Freed–Hardeman College, where he met his wife, Donna. Moving to Texas, he continued his education at Abilene Christian University, receiving a Bachelor of Arts degree (summa cum laude) in 1965 and a Master of Divinity degree in 1969. At this Churches of Christ school he was mentored by important scholars from the Stone-Campbell Restoration tradition, including Abraham Malherbe, Everett Ferguson, and Thomas H. Olbricht. After completing a Master of Theology degree at Princeton Theological Seminary under Bertil Gärtner, Holladay moved to England to pursue a Doctor of Philosophy degree at the University of Cambridge. Studying with C. F. D. Moule and Ernst Bammel, he finished his dissertation in 1975, writing on the "divine man" in Hellenistic Judaism and early Christianity.

After beginning his teaching career at Yale Divinity School in 1975, Holladay came to Candler School of Theology at Emory University in 1980, where he taught until his retirement in 2019. In addition to teaching New Testament, he served as academic dean for almost a decade. In 2002 he was named Charles Howard Candler Professor of New Testament.

Among Holladay’s many scholarly contributions are his critical editions of Hellenistic Jewish authors and his work on New Testament Christology and Luke-Acts.

Selected honors 
 F. J. A. Hort Memorial Fund Award, University of Cambridge, 1973
 Elected to membership in Studiorum Novi Testamenti Societas, 1979
 Fulbright Senior Scholar Award, Eberhard-Karls Universität, Tübingen, 1994–95
 Henry T. Luce, III, Fellow in Theology, Association of Theological Schools, 1999-2000
 Distinguished Alumni Award, Abilene Christian University, 2003
 President, Studiorum Novi Testamenti Societas, 2016–17
 Elected to membership in American Academy of Arts and Sciences, 2017

Selected works 
 THEIOS ANER in Hellenistic Judaism: A Critique of the Use of This Category in New Testament Christology. Society of Biblical Literature Dissertation Series, No. 40. Missoula, MT: Scholars Press, 1977.
 Commentary on First Corinthians. Austin, Texas: R. B. Sweet Publishing Co., 1978.
 Biblical Exegesis: A Beginner’s Handbook. (Co-authored with John H. Hayes.) Atlanta: John Knox Press, 1982/London: SCM Press, 1983. (Rev. ed., 1987; 3rd ed., 2007.)
 Fragments from Hellenistic Jewish Authors. Volume I: Historians. Society of Biblical Literature Texts and Translations, No. 20; Pseudepigrapha Series, No. 10. Chico, CA: Scholars Press, 1983.
 Preaching the New Common Lectionary. (Co-authored with Fred B. Craddock, John H. Hayes, and Gene M. Tucker.) Nashville: Abingdon Press, 1984-87.
 Fragments from Hellenistic Jewish Authors. Volume II: Poets. Society of Biblical Literature Texts and Translations, No. 30; Pseudepigrapha Series, No. 12. Atlanta: Scholars Press, 1989.
 Preaching Through the Christian Year. (Co-authored with Fred B. Craddock, John H. Hayes, and Gene M. Tucker.) Philadelphia: Trinity Press International, 1992-94.
 Fragments from Hellenistic Jewish Authors. Volume III: Aristobulus. Society of Biblical Literature Texts and Translations, No. 39; Pseudepigrapha Series, No. 13. Atlanta: Scholars Press, 1995.
 Fragments from Hellenistic Jewish Authors. Volume IV: Orphica. Society of Biblical Literature Texts and Translations, No. 40; Pseudepigrapha Series, No. 14. Atlanta: Scholars Press, 1996.
 A Critical Introduction to the New Testament: Interpreting the Message and Meaning of Jesus Christ. Nashville: Abingdon Press, 2005.
 Acts: A Commentary. New Testament Library. Louisville: Westminster John Knox Press, 2016.
 Introduction to the New Testament: Reference Edition. Waco, Texas: Baylor University Press, 2017.

References

External links 
 Faculty profile for Carl R. Holladay
 Curriculum vitae for Carl R. Holladay

Living people
Emory University faculty
American theologians
Princeton Theological Seminary alumni
Abilene Christian University alumni
1943 births
People from Huntingdon, Tennessee